Ruslan Arkadyevich Rybin (born 14 January 1992) is a former Russian professional football player.

Club career
He made his Russian Football National League debut for FC Chita on 6 August 2009 in a game against FC Salyut-Energiya Belgorod.

External links
 
 
 Career summary by sportbox.ru

1992 births
Living people
Russian footballers
Association football goalkeepers
FC Chita players